Auto Raja is a 2013 Indian Kannada-language romantic drama film written and directed by Uday Prakash, which stars Ganesh, Bhama and Deepika Kamaiah in the lead roles. The title is inspired by the popular Kannada film of the same title name released in 1980.

The film is produced jointly by Vishwa and Girish of V San Visions and the music is scored by Arjun Janya.

Cast 

 Ganesh as Raja
 Bhama as Radha / Rani
 Deepika Kamaiah
 Dileep Raj
 Dharma
 Arun Sagar
 Kavitha
 Sadhu Kokila
 Mamatha Rahuth
 Kuri Prathap
 Chandru
 Yathiraj

Production

Development
Director Uday Prakash, who earlier directed the comic-caper, Kalla Malla Sulla came up with an idea to pay tributes to actor Shankar Nag who featured in the blockbuster hit Auto Raja in the year 1980. With the same title name, he changed the script suitable for this decade. The script was written in 2010 and he was on a hunt for lead actors suitable to reprise the role of Nag. He took almost one and half years to find a bachelor hero through a voting system

Casting
Uday Prakash came up with a unique idea of finding his lead actor by creating an online poll. It resulted in actor Ajay Rao being the unanimous choice and he was signed on for the same. However, the project got much delayed in taking off and the actor refused the role due to date issues. This resulted in further delay as Prakash went in search of many other younger heroes with nobody willing to accept the role. Later, actor Ganesh was approached and it took at least 20 days to convince him to sign in for the role. Malayalam actress Bhama was soon signed for the lead heroine. For the other heroine, director approached Chaitra Chandranath, a budding actress, who reportedly walked out due to clash of dates and contract signed for another production. Another young actress, Deepika Kamaiah replaced Chaitra and confirmed her dates for the second lead role. The film also made headlines when the lead actress Bhama who until then only did homely roles agreed to do an item dance for the film.

Filming
After a delay of nearly 2 years of pre-production and casting, the film was officially launched on 22 August 2012 at the Milk Colony playground in Malleshwaram, Bangalore. The launch was attended by actor Sudeep to light the lamp and flag off the film that was faced by Ganesh in front of an auto rickshaw. The filming was shot at a stretch for 50 days in Bangalore location.

Box office
The film was completed 50 days and was declared as "Hit".

Soundtrack
The soundtrack was composed by Arjun Janya.

Home media
The movie was released on DVD with 5.1 channel surround sound and English subtitles and VCD.

References

External links
 

2013 films
Films set in Bangalore
2010s Kannada-language films
Indian romantic drama films
2013 romantic drama films
Indian films with live action and animation
Films scored by Arjun Janya